Arvid Fredrik "Sparven" Spångberg (April 3, 1890 – May 11, 1959) was a Swedish diver and bandy player. He competed in the 1908 Summer Olympics. He was born in Stockholm and died in New York City. He won the bronze medal in the 10 metre platform event.

Honours

Club 
 Djurgårdens IF
 Svenska Mästerskapet: 1908

References

External links
Arvid Spångberg's profile at Sports Reference.com

1890 births
1959 deaths
Swedish male divers
Swedish bandy players
Divers at the 1908 Summer Olympics
Medalists at the 1908 Summer Olympics
Olympic divers of Sweden
Olympic bronze medalists for Sweden
Olympic medalists in diving
Djurgårdens IF Bandy players
Male high divers
Divers from Stockholm
20th-century Swedish people